is a Japanese manga written by Takeshi Natsuhara and illustrated by Kuromaru.

The series was adapted as an 11-episode TV drama that was aired on TBS from April 14 to June 23, 2006. On March 8, 2008, Kurosagi with Tomohisa Yamashita starring as the Black Swindler once again, was released. Another television drama adaptation is set to premiere in October 2022.

It won the 2008 Shogakukan Manga Award for seinen/general manga.

Plot
Six years ago, Kurosaki's family was destroyed when a "shirosagi" (a "white swindler", who focuses on defrauding others) swindled Kurosaki's father of their family's life savings. As a result, his father killed Kurosaki's mother and sister before committing suicide. Since then, Kurosaki has devoted himself to becoming a "kurosagi" ("black swindler"), who swindles other swindlers, as a means of revenge.

As a "kurosagi", Kurosaki's acts have helped innocent victims of swindling schemes get their money back. However, he is frequently met with opposition by a stubborn grad student, who seeks to become a prosecutor.

Characters

 A 21-year-old famed swindler known as the Kurosagi (or Black Swindler) because he only targets professional swindlers, conning them out of their own money, leaving them in ruins, and then using that money to pay back his client who are con victims. His hatred against swindler started because his father was conned out of his wealth and left him with debts. This misfortune drove his father to kill his wife and daughter and, finally, himself. He tried to kill Katsuragi, who was connected to conman who led his family's misfortunes, but failed and recruited to be "pest control" for conmen who broke the "code" instead. He also possesses hatred to banks as banks gave his father final push to his despair.

 Tsurara Yoshikawa is a law student who disapproves of Kurosagi's swindling ways but falls in love with him. She lives in Kurosaki's apartment as a tenant. Her dream is to be a prosecutor. When she accidentally discovers Kurosaki's job as a "kurosagi", he kicks her out of the apartment in order to protect her from the repercussions of his actions rather than facing the other option of silencing her. She later returns as a tenant in Kurosaki's building with condition that she would not do anything which endangers Kurosaki's operations. A condition which she accepts as she is aware how powerful Katsuragi, Kurosaki's backer, in the criminal world and how connected he is. Tsurara has a deadbeat father who becomes an unwitting accomplice in a con operation. Kurosaki saves Tsurara's father by trapping the ringleader while leaving no traces of his involvement in the con operation. In the end of manga timeline, she manages to graduate the law school and becomes a prosecutor while still retaining his faith in law.

 Known as the "Fixer", Katsuragi is an information broker who supplies Kurosaki with information for a cut of the profit Kurosaki makes and supports Kurosaki with acts such as buying defunct companies and being the mastermind behind many of Kurosaki's schemes. Though he is somewhat of a father-figure to Kurosaki, he is a nefarious character as he employs other swindlers aside from Kurosaki. He uses his snack bar as his formal base. He is often seen cooking and a throwaway comment by author points out it is reason he is overweight is he eats all his cooking. He is significantly connected to conman who led Kurosakis' misfortunes. For that reason, Kurosaki tried to kill him but failed. Instead of killing Kurosaki, he recruited Kurosaki as titular Black Swindler.

 Appearing in the manga and film adaptation of the series, Masaru Kashina is the newly appointed assistant inspector of the East Tokyo Department, in charge of intellectual crimes. Self-righteous and dedicated to returning law and order to Tokyo, he becomes obsessed with apprehending Kurosaki after learning of the Black Swindler and his methods of operation. Because his paternal uncle was a swindler, Kashina was adopted by his mother's relatives and had faked his death when he was two years old in order to create a new identity in order to pursue the swindlers he despises. His obsession of Kurosaki partly stems from the fact that he is aware the fact that he and Kurosaki both have their lives destroyed by swindlers.
Yoichi Shiraishi
 Another Kurosagi or "Black Swindler". He always dress and acts elegantly, on and off the "job". Unlike Kurosaki who take the "job" offered by Katsuragi and acts against usually small time conmen, Shiraishi acts more as freelance who targets corrupt corporations. While Kurosaki acts as temporary partner and another "mark" to conmen, Shiraishi infiltrates the companies as career hopper. His hatred on corrupt companies stems from his past where his father was ordered by the real estate company he works to persuade their neighbors to move to a badly constructed building. One year after moving, an incident at the new building claimed six lives, including Shiraishi's mother. Shiraishi and his father had to endure their neighbor criticisms despite the fact that they are also victims.
Mikimoto
 A conman who is responsible for Kurosaki's father lost his savings and drove him to commit murder-suicide. He has a hobby on folding crane origami. He always leaves a headless crane origami to his mark when he almost completely trap his targets, symbolizing the target's fate.
Kuro
Kurosagi's pet cat. She is part Black Scottish Cat. As she is not purebred, she is unsalable. Kurosaki picked her from closed dishonest pet shop before the story starts. She is friendly Kurosaki and tenants of his building.

Cast
 Tomohisa Yamashita as Kurosaki (Kurosagi)
 Maki Horikita as Tsurara Yoshikawa 
 Yui Ichikawa as Yukari Mishima
 Koji Kato as Yoichi Shiraishi
 Tsutomu Yamazaki as Toshio Katsuragi
 Shiro Kishibe as Mikimoto
 Ryosei Tayama as Tetsuji Momoyama
 Reina as Yuuko Osawa
 Kaoru Okunuki as Hayasa
 Tetta Sugimoto as Kurosaki's Father
 Show Aikawa as Masaru Kashina

Reception
Kurosagi won the 53rd Shogakukan Manga Award for seinen/general manga along with Tetsuji Sekiya's Bambino! in 2008.

References

External links
 Official Website of Manga 
 Official Website of Drama 
 Official Website of Movie 
 

2003 manga
Business in anime and manga
Fraud in fiction
Japanese television dramas based on manga
Kin'yō Dorama
Seinen manga
Shogakukan manga
Thriller anime and manga
Television shows written by Eriko Shinozaki
Winners of the Shogakukan Manga Award for general manga